Reymond Hervey de Montmorency (6 October 1871 – 19 December 1938) was an English golfer, cricketer and rackets player.

Personal life
Born in Gonda, in India, de Montmorency was the son of Major Reymond Hervey de Montmorency and Marion Ellen Coles. He was educated at Cheltenham College, and St Paul's School, London. He worked for the Foreign Office and became a private school master before attending Keble College, Oxford, in January 1896, aged 24. He left Oxford with a Master of Arts. After leaving Oxford he was briefly at Malvern College before becoming a modern language master at Eton College from 1900 to 1927. He married Gwynedd Maud Thomas on 26 April 1905, with the couple having three children, Kathleen in 1906, Ann in 1911 and Reymond in 1916. He died at Sunningdale, Berkshire, on 19 December 1938. His daughter Ann married cricket writer Jim Swanton while Reymond junior served in World War II with the Royal Air Force,  and was killed in action in 1940.

Cricket career
De Montmorency was a right-handed batsman who bowled both leg breaks and right-arm slow-medium. He made his first-class debut playing for Oxford University Past and Present, a team composed of then current and former students, against the Gentlemen of Philadelphia in 1897. De Montmorency batted once in the match, scoring 31 runs before being dismissed by Percy Clark.

De Montmorency made his debut for Hertfordshire in the 1898 Minor Counties Championship against Cambridgeshire, which was his only appearance for the county that season, while the following season he once more made a single appearance for Hertfordshire, against Buckinghamshire. It was in 1899 that he played his first first-class match for Oxford University Cricket Club, which came against Surrey. He played two further first-class matches for the University in 1899, against the Marylebone Cricket Club and Cambridge University. It was in the match against Cambridge University that he scored his only first-class half century, making 62 runs.

He made his debut for Buckinghamshire in the 1907 Minor Counties Championship against Wiltshire. He appeared once more in 1907 against Berkshire, before appearing a final time in 1909 against Wiltshire.

Golf career
De Montmorency was a noted amateur golfer. He got his blue at Oxford in 1897, 1898 and 1899, being captain in 1898. He played for England in the 1908 England–Scotland Amateur Match and for the Amateurs in the 1911 Coronation Match and also represented the British team against the Americans at Hoylake in 1921, the match which led to the founding of the Walker Cup the following year.

De Montmorency's commitments at Eton restricted his playing opportunities and he did not play in the Amateur Championship until 1927, when he was 55 years old. He also made his only appearance in the Open Championship in 1927 and captained a team of four amateurs that played in South Africa in 1927/28.

Rackets career
De Montmorency got his blue in the doubles at rackets at Oxford in 1897 and 1899, playing with Harry Foster in 1897.

References

External links
Reymond de Montmorency at ESPNcricinfo
Reymond de Montmorency at CricketArchive

1871 births
1938 deaths
People from Gonda, Uttar Pradesh
People educated at Cheltenham College
People educated at St Paul's School, London
Alumni of Keble College, Oxford
English cricketers
Hertfordshire cricketers
Oxford University cricketers
Buckinghamshire cricketers
English male golfers
Amateur golfers
English racquets players
Teachers at Eton College
Sportspeople from Gloucestershire
Oxford University Past and Present cricketers